The T-arm or T-loop is a specialized region on the tRNA molecule which acts as a special recognition site for the ribosome to form a tRNA-ribosome complex during protein biosynthesis or translation (biology).

The T-arm has two components to it; the T-stems and the T-loop. 
 There are two T-stems of five base pairs each. T-stem 1 is from 49-53 and T-stem 2 is from 61-65. 
 The T-loop is also often known as the TΨC arm due to the presence of thymidine, pseudouridine and cytidine residues. 

Organisms with T-loop lacking tRNA exhibit a much lower level of aminoacylation and EF-Tu-binding than in organisms which have the native tRNA.

RNA
Protein biosynthesis